The 1973 Cal Poly Mustangs football team represented California Polytechnic State University, San Luis Obispo as a member of the California Collegiate Athletic Association (CCAA) during the 1973 NCAA Division II football season. Led by sixth-year head coach Joe Harper, Cal Poly compiled an overall record of 9–1 with a mark of 4–0 in conference play, winning the CCAA title for the fifth consecutive season. The Mustangs were ranked No. 8 by the Associated Press and No. 9 by the United Press International in the final NCAA College Division rankings. Cal Poly played home games at Mustang Stadium in San Luis Obispo, California.

Schedule

References

Cal Poly
Cal Poly Mustangs football seasons
California Collegiate Athletic Association football champion seasons
Cal Poly Mustangs football